Keonte Beals is a Canadian R&B singer and author from North Preston, Nova Scotia. 

Keonte is best known for his 2020 album KING, which was nominated for eight Music Nova Scotia Awards, winning three. In 2021, he wrote and published the children's book I Am Perfectly Me.

Discography

Albums  
 Keonte (2017)
 King (2020)

Awards and nominations

References 

21st-century Black Canadian male singers
Black Nova Scotians
Canadian contemporary R&B singers
Musicians from Halifax, Nova Scotia
Living people
Year of birth missing (living people)